McGill station is a Montreal Metro station in the borough of Ville-Marie in the downtown core of Montreal, Quebec, Canada. It is operated by the Société de transport de Montréal (STM) and serves the Green Line. The station opened on October 14, 1966, as part of the original network of the Metro.

It is currently the third busiest station (after Berri–UQAM station and Guy-Concordia station) in the network measured by number of passengers entering the system. Prior to 2002, it was the busiest station in the network. From 2024, the station will be served by the Réseau express métropolitain (REM).

Overview 

Designed by Crevier, Lemieux, Mercier and Caron, it is a normal side platform station built in open cut under boul. De Maisonneuve, with two ticket halls joined by corridors that surround the platforms. The station is named after, and is located adjacent to McGill University.

The ticket halls are linked to the platforms by four stairways per platform, including the shortest escalators in the network. The station has large pillars, which were originally painted orange, but painted in beer bottle green colour in the late 1990s. In January 2010 the STM repainted the station in its original colours being orange pillars and yellow walls.

As an important part of the underground city, the station has had its mezzanine level substantially enlarged since its opening, by construction of new buildings around the station: the western end of the mezzanine was added with the construction of the Tour BNP and Eaton Centre, while the southern corridor between the ticket halls was added to link the Promenades de la Cathédrale (now known as Promenades Cathédrale) with the station. 

No fewer than six buildings are directly connected to the station via underground city. The station has a further six direct street-level entrances, all of which are integrated into the façades of other buildings.

Among this busy station's amenities include several shops and services directly in the station, including a Tim Hortons, Second Cup, a Scotiabank, two Pizza Shops, a web terminal, and MétroVision information screens which displays news, commercials, and the time till the next train. This was second station after Berri-UQAM to have them installed.  At one time an "open-concept" branch of the Montreal Public Library was located next to the exit onto rue Université.

Renovation and upgrade works 
Other work included replacing the lighting system, fixing columns, beams, and concrete slabs and replacing granite staircases and handrails. The work was to be completed by March 2013. More recently (end of 2016), modernized signage has been put in place, flooring has been completely replaced and the stained glass installation underwent a restoration and was put back in place.

In 2020, work began on making the station universally accessible, ahead of the arrival of the REM. The project involves the construction of a new entrance building, two elevators and refurbishment of three of the other entrances.

Réseau express métropolitain station 
In November 2016, CDPQ Infra announced that the proposed Réseau express métropolitain (REM) system would connect to the Green line at McGill. As with the 1980s Line 3 proposal, the REM will use the historic Mont Royal tunnel to head north from downtown. The REM station will be located under McGill College Avenue, and a pedestrian tunnel will connect it to the Green Line station concourse, as well as the wider Underground City. CDPQ Infra indicate that the station will be the 2nd busiest station on the REM, with over 25,000 passengers per day.

Construction on the McGill REM station began in September 2018. In this location, the Mont Royal tunnel is not bored through solid rock, and therefore work to strengthen the historic tunnel was required. , the REM station is planned to open at the end of 2024.

Entrances 
The station has 6 entrances:
 690, De Maisonneuve Ouest
 640, De Maisonneuve Ouest
 811, De Maisonneuve Ouest
 2055, Boulevard Robert-Bourassa 
 2021, Avenue Union
 1445, Av. Union and La Baie

Architecture and art 

This station contains several pieces of artwork.

The most prominent is Nicolas Sollogoub's Montreal Scenes Circa 1830, depicting the industrial era in the city as well as its early mayors and civic arms. This set of five stained-glass murals was donated by Macdonald Tobacco, and installed in 1974. Maurice Savoie created a set of terra cotta murals depicting fruit and flowers, surrounding the entrance to Eaton's (now the Complexe Les Ailes). This were installed when the station opened in 1966. 

The construction of the Promenades de la Cathédrale in 1992 brought two new works of art, a light sculpture called Passūs by Murray MacDonald, and an installation of an aerial view of Montreal complete with miniature figures of the buildings, by art collective Les Industries perdues. The latter work is entitled To rise, we must push against the ground onto which we have fallen.

Finally, a tapestry by Kelvin McAvoy depicting the life of James McGill was donated by Canadian Universal Limited Insurance in 1969; however, after being vandalized, it was removed by the company for restoration, and then given as a perpetual loan to McGill University instead, where it is now exhibited at the McLennan Library.

Origin of the name

McGill is named for McGill University. Founded in 1821 with money and on land bequeathed by Scottish-Canadian businessman James McGill, this is one of Canada's most prestigious institutions of higher education.

Connecting bus routes

Nearby points of interest

Connected via the underground city
 Centre Eaton and Saint Catherine Street
 Tour McGill College and McGill College Avenue
 Place Montréal Trust
 Tour Industrielle-Vie
 2020 Robert-Bourassa 
 Place London Life/Les Galeries 2001 University Street
 McGill University - 688 Sherbrooke Street
 Hudson's Bay and avenue Union
 Place Ville Marie and Gare centrale
 Peel Metro station and points west
 Bonaventure Metro station and points south
 Place de la Cathédrale and Saint Catherine Street

Other 
 McGill University
 Percival Molson Memorial Stadium / Montreal Alouettes
 McCord Museum of Canadian History
 Redpath Museum
 Christ Church Cathedral
 CJNT-DT / Citytv studios
 Royal Victoria Hospital - Legacy Site
 Montreal Neurological Hospital
 Phillips Square

References

External links 

 McGill Station - official site
 Montreal by Metro, metrodemontreal.com - photos, information, and trivia
 2011 STM System Map
 2011 Downtown System Map
 Metro Map

Green Line (Montreal Metro)
Downtown Montreal
Railway stations in Canada opened in 1966
Railway stations in Canada at university and college campuses
Réseau express métropolitain railway stations